Wang Yue may refer to:

Wang Yue (chess player) (born 1987)
Wang Yue (biathlete) (born 1991), able-bodied biathlete
Wang Yue (judoka) (born 1997)
Wang Yue (skier) (born 1999), Paralympic skier and biathlete
Death of Wang Yue, 2011 viral incident from Foshan, China

See also
Wangyue Subdistrict, Yuelu District, Changsha, Hunan, China